William II, Duke of Jülich ( – 13 December 1393) was the second Duke of Jülich and the sixth William in the House of Jülich.  He was the second son of William I of Jülich and Joanna of Hainaut.

William was co-ruler from 1343.  He quarreled greatly with his father and imprisoned him from 1349-1351.  He tried for many years in Holland-Zeeland to enforce claims against the House of Wittelsbach but failed.  When his father died in 1361, William became the second Duke of Jülich, his elder brother Gerhard having predeceased their father.  He led the traditional feuds of the House of Jülich and lost Kaiserswerth and Zülpich, among others.  William intervened in favor of Edward in the catastrophic war of succession between his brothers-in-law Reinald and Edward for control of the Duchy of Guelders.  He took part in the 1371 Battle of Baesweiler (in which Edward was mortally wounded) and captured Wenceslaus I, Duke of Luxembourg.  His brother-in-law Reinald died later in 1371 and as neither Reinald nor Edward left heirs, another fight for the succession of Guelders arose between William and his wife Maria (sister to Reinald and Edward) and Maria's sister Mathilde, wife of John II, Count of Blois.  In 1377, Emperor Charles IV granted Guelders to William's son William, but the title was not secured until 1379.  Among other territories, William acquired Monschau-Montjoie, Randerath and Linnich.

Family and children
William married in December 1362 to Maria of Guelders ( – November 1397), daughter of Reinald II of Guelders.  They had three children:

 William (1364–1402)
 Reinald ( – 1423)
 Joanna, married John V, Lord of Arkel.  She succeeded her brother Reinald as Duke of Guelders and was the grandmother of Arnold, Duke of Guelders

Ancestry

References

External links 
 Genealogie-Mittelalter.de
 Lower Rhine Nobility

Dukes of Jülich
1327 births
1393 deaths
House of Jülich-Hengebach